"Sunday Morning Sunshine" is a song written and performed by Harry Chapin. The song was included on his 1972 album, Sniper and Other Love Songs. The song was released as a single the same year as his top 20 hit, "Taxi" and debut album, Heads & Tales.  Cash Box described it as a "realistic look at city life." The song charted on the Billboard Hot 100, however it received more commercial success when it charted as a top 30 on the Billboard Adult Contemporary. The song has also been included on numerous posthumous compilation albums. King Biscuit Flower Hour recorded a live performance of the song for the show.

Chart performance

Weekly charts

Year-end charts

Other uses
 The Swinging Blue Jeans covered the song on a single released in 1975.
 Tom Chapin and Steve Chapin's live performance is included on The Chapin Family's Harry Chapin: A Celebration in Song: Volume I album.

References

1972 songs
Elektra Records singles
Harry Chapin songs
Songs written by Harry Chapin